Adaptor protein, phosphotyrosine interacting with PH domain and leucine zipper 1 (APPL1), or DCC-interacting protein 13-alpha (DIP13alpha), is a protein that in humans is encoded by the APPL1 gene. APPL1 contains several key interactory domains: pleckstrin homology (PH) domain, phosphotyrosine-binding (PTB) domain and Bin–Amphiphysin–Rvs (BAR) domain.

Function 
APPL1 is an adaptor protein localized to a subset of Rab5-positive ("early") endosomes, where it recruits other binding partners and regulates vesicle trafficking and endosomal signalling. APPL1 is enriched at very early endosomes which are negative for EEA1, indicating that APPL1 affects the earliest stages of endosomal traffic before EEA1 takes over. This is in line with observations that APPL1 and EEA1 compete for Rab5 binding. APPL1 affects the speed of internalization of key endosomal cargo (eg. EGF receptor) which is dependent on Rab5 activation.

PTB domain of APPL1 regulates many cell signalling events in specific endosomal compartments - sometimes termed the "signalling endosomes". This includes lysophosphatidic acid (LPA)-induced signaling (together with interacting protein GIPC1). Additional roles for APPL1 were pinpointed to the nucleus where APPL1 can localize once dissociated from endosomes.

Mutant studies

Interactions 

APPL1 has been shown to interact with Deleted in Colorectal Cancer, AKT2, but also Rab5, Rab21, OCRL and almost 30 other proteins.

References

Further reading

External links